Platynota redingtonensis is a species of moth   of the family Tortricidae. It is found in Arizona in the United States.

References

Moths described in 2012
Platynota (moth)